Santa Brigida or Santa Brígida (Portuguese and Spanish for Saint Brigit) may refer to:

People
 Saint Brigid of Kildare
 Saint Birgitta of Sweden

Places
Brazil
 Santa Brígida, Bahia

Italy
 Santa Brigida, the Swedish National Church in Rome
 Santa Brigida, Lombardy a comune in the Province of Bergamo

Spain
 Santa Brígida, Las Palmas, a municipality in the Province of Las Palmas

Ships
 Santa Brigida, Spanish treasure ship; see Action of 16 October 1799